Downtown Brooklyn: A Journal of Writing (ISSN 1536-8475) was an annual American literary magazine which was published between 1992 and 2018.

History and profile
Downtown Brooklyn was founded by the poets Barbara Henning, Rudy Baron and Wayne Berninger.  

The first annual issue appeared in 1992.  

The magazine was published annually and was edited by faculty and students in the English Department at the Brooklyn Campus of Long Island University. 

The editors accepted submissions of poetry, literary prose, and visual art from faculty, staff and students at the campus, although cover art was at times solicited from local artists who had shown their work in campus galleries. 

Downtown Brooklyn went online in 2014. Issues number 23-25 appeared as PDFs, and issues number 26-27 appeared in the form of Tumblr blogs. Issue 27 was the final issue.  

Full sets of print back-issues are available in the Periodicals Collection of Salena Library at Long Island University (Brooklyn Campus) and in the Little Magazine Collection of Memorial Library at The University of Wisconsin–Madison.

References

External links
Downtown Brooklyn: A Journal of Writing, English Department website, Long Island University (Brooklyn Campus)
Little Magazine Collection, Memorial Library, University of Wisconsin–Madison
Salena Library, Long Island University (Brooklyn Campus)

Annual magazines published in the United States
Defunct literary magazines published in the United States
Long Island University
Magazines established in 1992
Magazines disestablished in 2014
Magazines published in Wisconsin